Edward M. Early (born October 2, 1935) is a former member of the Pennsylvania State Senate, serving from 1975 to 1986.  He also served in the Pennsylvania House of Representatives.

Life
Born on October 2, 1935 in Allegheny County, Pennsylvania, Edward M. Early was a son of Edward A. Early and Christina Marie (Snead) Early, and was married to Sandy Chestnut.

A Democrat, he was a member of the Pennsylvania State House of Representatives from 1971 to 1974, and then represented the 40th District of the Pennsylvania State Senate from 1975 to 1986.

External links

References

Democratic Party Pennsylvania state senators
Democratic Party members of the Pennsylvania House of Representatives
Living people
1935 births